Kanta is an Indian and Bengali name that may refer to the following people:

Kanta Gupta (1938–2016), Indian mathematician
Kanta Nalawade, Indian politician from Maharashtra
Kanta Rao (1923–2009), Indian film actor and producer from Telugu cinema
Kanta Saroop Krishen, Indian social worker 
Kanta Subbarao, Indian virologist, molecular geneticist, and physician-scientist 
Albert Kanta Kambala (1958–2008), Zaire football midfielder
Balivada Kanta Rao (1927–2000), Indian Telugu novelist and playwright
Kamala Kanta Kalita, Indian politician
Krishna Kanta Handique (1898–1982), Indian Sanskrit scholar
Laxmi Kanta Chawla, Indian Punjabi politician
Rajani Kanta Barman (born 1979), Bangladeshi football defender
Rajani Kanta Patir (1917–?), Indian Administrative Service officer
Rajat Kanta Ray, Bengali historian
Rama Kanta Dewri, Indian politician
Snehansu Kanta Acharya (1913–1986), Advocate General of West Bengal, India
Subhrangsu Kanta Acharyya (born 1940), Indian geologist
Surjya Kanta Mishra, Indian politician
Tarini Kanta Roy, Indian politician
Uma Kanta Chaudhari, Nepalese politician